Tehran: City of Love is a 2018 Iranian comedy-drama film, directed by Ali Jaberansari.

Cast 
 Mina – Forough Ghajabagli 
 Vahid – Mehdi Saki
 Hessam – Amir Hessam Bakhtiari
 Niloufar – Behnaz Jafari

Critical reception 
The film received positive reviews, with much praise going to the actors' performances (particularly Bakhtiari's). It was selected to be part of the BFI London Film Festival 2018 and the International Film Festival Rotterdam 2019.

References

External links 
 
 

2018 films
Iranian comedy-drama films
2018 comedy-drama films